Kristian Brix (born 13 June 1990) is a former Norwegian-born Gambian footballer.

His mother is Norwegian, and his father is Gambian.

Career
Brix was the first ever player born in the 1990s to appear with Vålerenga's first team, and he has featured in both domestic and UEFA Cup competition. He scored against Lithuanian side Ekranas in August 2007. He played four games in Tippeligaen 2007. He spent the first half of the 2008 season on loan to Sogndal.

On 3 December 2010 he signed a three-year contract with Sandefjord.

On 2 January 2015 Kristian switched his allegiance to Gambia and is keen to play for the Senior Scorpions. He received his first international call in March 2017.

14 January 2019, Brix signed with KFUM. After the 2019 season Brix decide to retire from football.

Career statistics

References

External links

1990 births
Living people
Footballers from Oslo
Norwegian people of Gambian descent
Norwegian footballers
Gambian footballers
Association football midfielders
Association football defenders
Vålerenga Fotball players
Sogndal Fotball players
Sandefjord Fotball players
FK Bodø/Glimt players
Fredrikstad FK players
Sandnes Ulf players
KFUM-Kameratene Oslo players
Eliteserien players
Norwegian First Division players